The Association of Baptist Churches in Ireland (ABC, ABCi and ABCI) is a Baptist Christian denomination based in Ireland. It is a group of 117 autonomous Baptist churches working together in fellowship and evangelism, training and caring ministries. The association only acts on behalf of the churches for the work which the churches have agreed to do together.

History

The Association of Baptist Churches in Ireland has its origins in the establishment of Baptist churches in Cork (1640), Dublin (1642) and Waterford (1650). In 1725, there were 11 Baptist churches, and 9 formed the Irish Baptist Association. The Irish Baptist Association was reorganised in 1862, and was replaced by the Baptist Union of Ireland in 1895. Irish Baptists initially had a close relationship with the English Baptists. However, desire for independence caused the Irish Baptists to follow their own path and they set up the Union in 1895. The first Assembly meeting of the newly formed Union took place in May 1895 in Mountpottinger Baptist Church, Belfast with 27 churches present with two more being added to the membership in that meeting. They supported Charles Spurgeon during the Downgrade Controversy that raged in the Baptist Union of Great Britain. The Union returned to its original name of the Association of Baptist Churches in Ireland in 2000, highlighting that they are an association of churches of like mind which seek to work and fellowship together. According to a denomination census released in 2020, it claimed 117 churches and 8,500 members.

Organisation
Departments include Baptist Women, Baptist Youth, Missions, Welfare, and Training (Irish Baptist Historical Society and Irish Baptist College). The ABC Insight is a bi-monthly magazine serving the churches. The Baptist Centre comprising the administrative offices and the Irish Baptist College is located near Moira, County Down, Northern Ireland. The association holds an annual assembly in May. The Churches Council meets during the week of the annual assembly and also annually in November. The purpose of the Council is to hear reports and conduct business. Matters are handled between sessions by the executive committee elected by the churches at the May Churches Council meeting.

Training

Promotes training among the churches and operates the Irish Baptist College which seeks to train men and women for pastoral and necessary services.

Caring Ministries

By means of the Orphan Society, Annuity Fund and Baptist Aid provides support for those in need.

Members
Association members are referred to as Irish Baptists, however some choose to refer to themselves as Association Baptists to distinguish them from other Baptists.

 Hugh D. Brown, an author, pastor-teacher in Dublin, politician in the Irish Unionist Alliance, President of the Irish Baptist Association and theologian.
 Alexander Carson, author of Baptism in its Mode and Subjects, pastor-teacher and theologian.
 William Young Fullerton

 Hamilton Moore

See also

Irish Baptist College

References

Further reading
 Carson, Alexander (Introduction); Nicholas, Elmer H. (Introduction); Green, Jay. (Preface) (2000) "Baptism, Its Mode and Subjects", Sovereign Grace Publishers Inc, Binding: Hardcover Pub. Date: 2000, 
 Leonard, Bill J. (c2003) "Baptist Ways", Judson Press, Valley Forge, PA, Binding: (alk. paper), Date: c2003, 
 McBeth, Leon H. (c1987) "The Baptist Heritage", Broadman Press, Nashville, TN Date: c1987 
 Wardin, Albert W. (Editor) (c1995) "Baptists Around the World", Broadman & Holman, Nashville, TN Date: c1995. 
 White, B. R. (1971–77) "Association records of the Particular Baptists of England, Wales and Ireland to 1660", Baptist Historical Society, London, UK Date: 1971-77

External links
 

1862 establishments in Ireland
All-Ireland organisations
Baptist denominations established in the 19th century
Baptist denominations in the United Kingdom
Protestantism in Ireland
Protestantism in the Republic of Ireland
Protestantism in Northern Ireland
Religious organisations based in Northern Ireland
Religious organizations established in 1862